Kangeyam taluk is a taluk of Tirupur district of the Indian state of Tamil Nadu. The headquarters of the taluk is the town of Kangeyam.
Kangeyam Taluk Formed From Bifurcation of Dharapuram taluk.

Demographics
According to the 2011 census, the taluk of Kangeyam had a population of 208,227 with 104,167  males and 104,060 females. There were 999 women for every 1000 men. The taluk had a literacy rate of 69.25. Child population in the age group below 6 was 7,329 Males and 6,874 Females.

Villages under Kangayam Taluk
The taluk has 2 panchayat union
Kangeyam
Vellakoil

The taluk is divided into 4 Firkas
Kangeyam
Uthiyur
Nathakadaiyur
Vellakoil

The following villages are under Kangayam taluk.
Alampadi
Bala sumathiram pudur
Ganapathypalayam
Keeranoor
Maravapalayam 
Semmankalippalayam 
Marudurai	
Nathakadaiyur
Padiyur
Palayakottai
Pappani 
Paranjeervazhi
Pothyapalayam 
Sivanmalai
Thamburetty palayam 
Veeranapalayam 
Valliarachal
Veeracholapuram 
Thittuparai
Arutholuvu
Uthiyur
Nillali
Nillali goundampalayam

References 

Taluks of Tiruppur district